Zhan Garden may refer to several gardens in China:

 Zhan Yuan (Nanjing)
 Zhan Garden, Zhongshan